
Gmina Dobryszyce is a rural gmina (administrative district) in Radomsko County, Łódź Voivodeship, in central Poland.

Villages
Gmina Dobryszyce contains the villages and settlements of Blok Dobryszyce, Borowa, Borowiecko, Dobryszyce, Galonki, Rożny, Ruda, Wiewiórów, Żaby and Zalesiczki.

Neighbouring gminas
Gmina Dobryszyce is bordered by the town of Radomsko and by the gminas of Gomunice, Kamieńsk, Kleszczów, Ładzice, Lgota Wielka and Radomsko.

References
Polish official population figures 2006

Dobryszyce
Radomsko County